János Szabó may refer to:

 János Szabó (1767–1858) abbot of the Kolozsmonostor Abbey in Transylvania
 János Szabó (footballer) (born 1989), footballer for BFC Siófok
 János Szabó (Minister of Agriculture) (born 1937), Hungarian jurist and former politician, Minister of Agriculture 1993–1994
 János Szabó (Minister of Defence) (born 1941), Hungarian politician, Minister of Defence 1998–2002
 János Szabó (runner) (born 1945), Hungarian Olympic athlete